Oakland Park is the name of several places in the United States:

Albert Oakland Park, a park in Columbia, Missouri
Oakland Park, Florida, a city
Oakland Park, Missouri, a former village
Oakland Park, New Jersey, a temporary home (two games in 1889) of the New York Giants baseball team
Oakland Park (Columbus, Georgia), a neighborhood